Miss Supranational 2021 was the 12th edition of the Miss Supranational pageant. It was held on 21 August 2021, in Nowy Sącz, Poland. Anntonia Porsild of Thailand crowned Chanique Rabe of Namibia as her successor at the end of the event. This edition marks the first time in history that an African country won the Miss Supranational pageant.

The edition was originally scheduled at the end of 2020 but was postponed due to the global COVID-19 pandemic.

Background
On 14 April 2021, Gerhard Parzutka von Lipinski, the president of Miss and Mister Supranational, announced that Miss Supranational 2021 is scheduled to be held on August 21 in Strzelecki Park Amphitheater, Nowy Sącz, Małopolska, Poland.

Results

Placements

Notes:
§ – placed into the Top 12 by fan-voting challenge
Δ – placed into the Top 24 by fast-track challenges

Continental Queens of Beauty

Special awards

Order of announcements

Top 24

Top 12

Top 5

Challenge events

Supra Chat

Round 1

Semi-final

Supra Fan-Vote
The winner of the Supra Fan Vote will automatically advance to the Top 12 finalists of Miss Supranational 2021.

Top Model
The winner of Top Model will automatically advance to the Top 24 semifinalists of Miss Supranational 2021.

Miss Talent

Miss Elegance

Supra Influencer

Challenge Finalists

Final Result
The winner of Supra Influencer will automatically advance to the Top 24 semifinalists of Miss Supranational 2021.

Contestants
58 delegates from around the world have been selected to participate and have competed for the title of Miss Supranational 2021.

Notes

Returns
Last competed in 2011:
 
Last competed in 2015:
 
Last competed in 2016:
 
Last competed in 2017:
 
Last competed in 2018:

Withdrawals
  – Adis Rachell Herrera Reyes did not compete due to the COVID-19 pandemic.
  – Mayra Jansodin Zúñiga Álvarez did not compete due to the COVID-19 pandemic.

References

External links 
 

2021
2021 beauty pageants